Marek Brodzki (born 25 December 1960) is a Polish film director and television director. He directed the film and series versions of Wiedźmin aka The Hexer and the series Miasteczko. He has worked as First Assistant Director with top Polish directors Andrzej Wajda and Krzysztof Zanussi and has specialized as a Polish First Assistant Director and Second Unit Director on international productions made in Poland notably including Steven Spielberg's Schindler's List and has a long working relationship with German director Volker Schlöndorff. October 2015 he was awarded the Bronze Medal for Merit to Culture – Gloria Artis.

He is married to Production Manager, Casting Director, First Assistant Director Ewa Brodzka.

Selected filmography

Feature films:

 2010 Beyond the Steppes – with director Vanja d'Alcantara – Line Producer: Poland/Kazakhstan
 2008 A Woman in Berlin (Anonyma – Eine Frau in Berlin) – with director Max Färberböck – Asst. Director: Poland
 2006 Ulzhan – with director Volker Schlöndorff – First Asst. Director, Line Producer
 2006 Strike (Strajk) – with director Volker Schlöndorff – First Asst. Director
 2003 The Revenge (Zemsta) – with director Andrzej Wajda – First Asst. Director
 2002 The Pianist – with director Roman Polanski – Crowd Marshall
 1999 Pan Tadeusz – with director Andrzej Wajda – First Asst. Director
 1999 Jakob the Liar – with director Peter Kassovitz – First Asst. Director: Poland
 1999 Rider of the Flames (Feuerreiter) – with director Nina Grosse – Second Unit Director
 1998 Ibangin – with director Moon Seung-wook – Second Unit Director, First Asst. Director
 1997  – with director Krzysztof Zanussi – First Asst. Director
 1997 Un Air Si Pur – with director Yves Angelo – First Asst. Director
 1996 L'Elève – with director Olivier Schatzky – First Asst. Director
 1996 The Ogre (Der Unhold) – with director Volker Schlöndorff – First Asst. Director: Poland
 1995 Les Milles – with director  – First Asst. Director: Poland
 1994 Le Colonel Chabert – with director Yves Angelo – First Asst. Director: Battle Scenes
 1994 El Detective y la Muerte – with director Gonzalo Suárez – First Asst. Director: Poland
 1993 Schindler's List – with director Steven Spielberg – Polish First Asst. Director
 1993 La Petite Apocalypse – with director Costa-Gavras – Asst. Director
 1992  – with director Krzysztof Zanussi – Asst. Director
 1991 Beltenebros – with director Pilar Miró – First Asst. Director: Poland
 1991 Life for Life (Zycie Za Zycie) – with director Krzysztof Zanussi – First Asst. Director
 1991 Eminent Domain – with director John Irvin – Asst. Director
 1988  (Gdzieśkolwiek jest, jeśliś jest...) – with director Krzysztof Zanussi – Asst. Director

Television films:

 2008 Stauffenberg – the True Story – German ZDF TV film
 2007 Das Wunder von Mogadischu (Miracle of Mogadishu) – German ZDF TV film
 2006 Die Hölle von Verdun – German ZDF TV film
 2005 Das Drama von Dresden (the Drama of Dresden) – with director Sebastian Dehnhardt – Emmy Award for best documentary
 2005 Wir Weltmeister – German ZDF TV film

Television series:

 2004 Hitler's Managers – Germany
 2002 Wiedźmin (The Hexer) – Poland
 2000–01 Miasteczko – Poland

Internet TV series:
 2009 Zobaczyć ciszę – Poland
It was the first in Europe TV serial in sign language about a deaf family.

References

External links
Marek Brodzki at the Filmpolski Database
 

1960 births
Living people
Polish film directors
German-language film directors
Recipients of the Bronze Medal for Merit to Culture – Gloria Artis